McArthur Lake Wildlife Management Area at  is an Idaho wildlife management area in Bonner and Boundary counties located between Sandpoint and Bonners Ferry. It was established in 1942 to protect and enhance waterfowl habitat. 
It lies within the McArthur Lake Wildlife Corridor.

The WMA includes the riparian zones around McArthur Lake that provide a variety of wildlife, including moose, elk, beaver, and river otters with habitat and food. White-tailed deer and Canada geese are abundant, and hunting is permitted.

References

Protected areas established in 1942
Protected areas of Bonner County, Idaho
Protected areas of Boundary County, Idaho
Wildlife management areas of Idaho
1942 establishments in Idaho